Entonaema is a genus of fungi in the family Xylariaceae. The genus is widespread, especially in tropical areas, and contains six species.

References

Xylariales
Ascomycota genera
Taxa described in 1901